The Chrysler California Cruiser was a concept car created by Chrysler. It debuted at the 2002 Paris Motor Show, showing the possible future design of the Chrysler PT Cruiser. It also had the ability to convert to a "hotel room" for two.

The California Cruiser used a 2.4 L turbocharged I4 engine producing . Inside, it featured silver inserts on the door trim, quarter panels, and hatchback trim. The Cruiser also had an integrated stereo system in the liftgate. The exterior was suited for the average surfer (hence the name, since California is famous for its surfers). The fog lamps on the California Cruiser are a visible difference, although the 2006 PT Cruiser used similar-looking lamps.

See also
 Chrysler PT Cruiser

References

External links
Automotive Intelligence - Chrysler California Cruiser
Car Design News: Chrysler California Cruiser
Automobile Magazine: 2002 Paris Auto Show: Chrysler California Cruiser

California Cruiser